Northern Bavarian is a dialect of Bavarian, together with Central Bavarian and Southern Bavarian. Bavarian is mostly spoken in the Upper Palatinate, although not in Regensburg, which is a primarily Central Bavarian–speaking area, according to a linguistic survey done in the late 1980s. According to the same survey, Northern Bavarian is also spoken in Upper Franconia, as well as in some areas in Upper and Lower Bavaria, such as in the areas around Eichstätt and Kelheim. Few speakers remained in the Czech Republic, mostly concentrated around Aš and Železná Ruda, at the time of the survey, but considering the time which has passed since the survey, the dialect may be extinct in those places today. If it still exists there, it would include the ostegerländische Dialektgruppe. Ethnologue estimates that there were 9,000 speakers of Bavarian in the Czech Republic in 2005, but does not clarify if these were Northern Bavarian speakers.

According to the same linguistic survey, the dialect is flourishing in the areas where it is spoken, despite the fact that most speakers actively use Standard German. In the south of the area where Northern Bavarian is spoken, Central Bavarian is said to have higher prestige, and Northern Bavarian characteristics are therefore not as visible as in the north, where speakers even tend to use a heavy Northern Bavarian accent when speaking German.

Phonology

Vowels 
Northern Bavarian has 8 vowels:

And 11 diphthongs:

In southern varieties of Northern Bavarian the diphthongs  are realized with an opener offset, i.e. .

An interesting aspect of the diphthongs are the so-called reversed diphthongs, or in German, gestürzte Diphthonge. They are called so because the Middle High German diphthongs  became  ( became  after unrounding) in Northern Bavarian, while they generally became  in Standard German.

The Northern Bavarian diphthong  corresponds to the Middle High German and Standard German . Compare Standard German Schaf , Stroh  and Northern Bavarian , . Compare Standard German Schnee , böse  with Northern Bavarian , .

In many Northern Bavarian variants, nasalization is increasingly common.

Consonants 
Northern Bavarian has about 33 consonants:

 is realized as either  or  when occurring postvocally.

 may be syllabic, as in Northern Bavarian ; compare Standard German Mühle.

Grammar

Nouns

Gender 
All nouns in Northern Bavarian have one of three genders: feminine, masculine and neuter. Many nouns have the same gender as in Standard German, but there are many exceptions. An example is Benzin, which is neuter in Standard German, but masculine in Northern Bavarian. Another example is Butter, which is feminine in Standard German, but can be all three genders in Northern Bavarian depending on where in the Northern Bavarian–speaking you are.

Case 
As in Standard German there are four cases in Northern Bavarian: nominative, accusative, genitive and dative. The genitive case, however, is uncommon and is commonly replaced either with the dative and a possessive pronoun or with the preposition von  and the dative, e.g. , or  father's house.  An exception is the genitive instead of the dative after the singular possessive pronouns, e.g. , which is as correct as  behind me. Prepositions take the dative or the accusative, but not the genitive, e.g.  (formally ) despite the rain. The dative ending -m often sounds like the accusative ending -n (see the previous example), so that these two cases are not distinguishable.

Inflection 
Nouns in Northern Bavarian are inflected for number, and to a lesser extent, case. Inflecting for number is common across all three genders, and especially umlaut is productive, in particular in masculine nouns. Many nouns, across the genders, are the same in the plural as in the singular.

English head, Standard German Kopf, Northern Bavarian sg. m.  > pl. 
English cat, Standard German Katze, Northern Bavarian sg. f.  > pl. 
English house, Standard German Haus, Northern Bavarian sg. n.  > pl. 

Many weak feminine nouns have the ending  in most cases, though not to be confused with the plural ending. Weak neuter nouns have almost been lost, with only strong remaining, and therefore inflection for case is basically nonexistent.

English boy, Standard German Bube, Northern Bavarian m. nom.  > m. acc./dat.

Adjectives 
The inflection of adjectives in Northern Bavarian differ depending on whether the adjective is preceded by a definite article or a demonstrative, or if it is preceded by an indefinite article or a possessive, or if it is used as a predicate, of which the latter is only present in some varieties. Adjectives without any determiner rarely occur.

Below can the inflectional paradigms be seen, with the adjective  serving as an example. This is also the form used in all situations, when the adjective is used as a predicate, and therefore no paradigm is needed. Compare Northern Bavarian  with the Standard German alt, in English old.

Compare with the Standard German gross and breit, in English big and broad.

Comparative adjectives are formed by suffixing , and superlative adjectives are formed by suffixing . Vowel changes often take place when the suffixation happens. Compare with the Standard German hoch, höher and höchsten, in English high, higher and highest.

Pronouns 
The pronouns of Northern Bavarian differ slightly from variety to variety. Furthermore, there are two pairs of pronouns, one used when in stressed position and the other used when unstressed.

There is no gender distinction in the plural.

The ending  in the stressed first person singular nominative and -accusative and in stressed the second person singular accusative is only present in northern- and western varieties of Northern Bavarian.

Verbs 
Verbs in Northern Bavarian are conjugated for person, tense and mood. The Northern Bavarian verbs are also subject to both vowel change and apophony.

Non-finite forms 

Present tense 
The personal endings for the present tense differ slightly from variety to variety, but are largely uniform. The endings in the scheme below are attached to the stem, and not the non-finite form.

As can be seen in the scheme above, the first person singular is basically the same as the stem, and the first- and third persons plural are the same as the non-finite form. Furthermore, the third person singular is realized as - when occurring before a fortis obstruent, and that in some southern varieties of Northern Bavarian the first person plural has the ending -, and therefore isn't the non-finite form.

The singular imperative is the same as the first person singular, and the plural imperative is the same as the second person plural.

Past tense 
Only one verb with a distinct simple past tense form remains, Standard German sein, English to be, with the simple past tense form , Standard German war, English was. The past tense of other verbs is formed in the same way as Standard German uses haben or sein, English to have and to be, respectively, and the past participle.

The past participle in Northern Bavarian is formed by the prefix -, although not on verbs beginning with a plosive consonant, where the prefix is left out.

Compare with Standard German gehaben and gewesen, English had and been.

Examples can be seen below:
 , Standard German Ich habe geschüttet, English I have shaken
 , Standard German Er hat gebracht, English He has brought

Subjunctive 
It is quite straightforward to form the subjunctive in Northern Bavarian. The subjunctive of verbs is formed with the suffix -, as in  > , Standard German wissen > wüßte, English to know > I would know.

Apophony 
Both weak verbs and strong verbs may undergo apophony. The strong verbs can be split into two groups: the first group where the vowel in the non-finite form is the same as in the past participle; and the second group where the vowel in the non-finite form is different from the vowel in the past participle. The most common vowel gradations in the second group can be seen below:

  > :  > , Standard German schneiden > geschnitten - English to cut
  > , :  > , Standard German bieten > geboten - English to offer
  > :  > , Standard German singen > gesungen - English to sing
  > :  > , Standard German dreschen > gedroschen - English to thresh

Apophony is not as common with weak verbs as in Standard German. However, the number of weak verbs with morphophonological variations is high, especially change in vowel length is common.

Example 
This is a phonetic transcription of a text in Northern Bavarian, with translations in German and English.

References

External links 
 Sprechender Sprachatlas von Bayern (Speaking Language Atlas of Bavaria, with dialect maps from the book Kleiner Bayerischer Sprachatlas, and sound recordings)
 DiWA - Digitaler Wenker-Atlas (Digital Wenker-Atlas, with dialect maps and more) - the map Nordbairischer Sprachatlas from the menu item DiWA --> Karten, and then Auswahl (a technical advice: choose erweiterte Ausgabe, and then in the menu item DiWA --> Installation/Einstellungen under ECS-Darstellung the radio button HTML, its independent from plugins and java)

Bavarian language
German dialects
Languages of Germany

de:Bairische Dialekte#Nordbairisch